Bear River is an unincorporated community in Itasca and Saint Louis counties in the U.S. state of Minnesota.

The community is located 24 miles west of Cook at the intersection of County Road 22 and County Road 916 (Saint Louis–Itasca Judicial Road).  Bear River is located 31 miles east of Effie.

The Bear River, a tributary of the Sturgeon River, flows through the community.

Saint Louis County Highway 5 and Minnesota State Highway 65 are both nearby.

Bear River is 26 miles north of Chisholm; and 31 miles north of Hibbing.

Bear River is located within Morcom Township in Saint Louis County; and also located within Bearville Township in Itasca County.

The communities of Togo, Celina, and Side Lake are nearby.

Bear River is the home town of the Minnesota Twins mascot TC Bear.

Headquarters of Team Ugly Racing.

References

 Rand McNally Road Atlas – 2007 edition – Minnesota entry
 Official State of Minnesota Highway Map – 2011/2012 edition
 Mn/DOT map of Itasca County – Sheet 3 – 2011 edition
 Mn/DOT map of Saint Louis County – Sheet 3 – 2011 edition

Unincorporated communities in Minnesota
Unincorporated communities in Itasca County, Minnesota
Unincorporated communities in St. Louis County, Minnesota